Sanaz Marand (born June 21, 1988) is an American former tennis player.

In her career, she won two singles titles and 20 doubles titles on the ITF Women's Circuit. In October 2014, she reached her best singles ranking of world No. 242. In November 2015, she peaked at No. 119 in the doubles rankings.

Marand made her WTA Tour debut at the 2014 Washington Open in doubles, partnering with Louisa Chirico; they lost to Arina Rodionova and Olivia Rogowska in the first round. 

Marand played collegiate tennis at the University of North Carolina at Chapel Hill, where she received All American honors and graduated in 2010.

ITF Circuit finals

Singles: 5 (2 titles, 3 runner–ups)

Doubles: 37 (20 titles, 17 runner–ups)

References

External links
 
 

1988 births
Living people
People from Katy, Texas
Sportspeople from Harris County, Texas
American female tennis players
North Carolina Tar Heels women's tennis players
American people of Iranian descent
Tennis people from Texas